Government of Greece (officially: Government of the Hellenic Republic; also Greek Government or Hellenic Government) is the government of the Third Hellenic Republic, reformed to its present form in 1974.

The head of government is the Prime Minister of Greece. He recommends ministers and deputy ministers to the President of the Republic for an appointment. The prime minister, the ministers, and the alternate ministers belong to the Ministerial Council, the supreme decision-making committee. Usually, ministers and alternates sit in the Parliament. They are accountable to the Constitution. Deputy ministers are not members of the government. 

Other collective government bodies, apart from the Ministerial Council, are the Committee on Institutions, the Government Council for Foreign Affairs and Defence and others, including particular government policy issues.

References

External links
 

 
Greece
European governments